Croatian Bank for Reconstruction and Development (HBOR) is Croatia's national development bank. Its task is the promotion of the development of the Croatian economy by extending loans, insuring export transactions against political and commercial risks, issuing guarantees, and providing business advice.

References

External links

 

Banks of Croatia
Organizations based in Zagreb
Banks established in 1992
Government-owned companies of Croatia
European investment banks
Croatian companies established in 1992
National development banks